Aleksei Vladimirovich Ivanov (born 1 September 1981) is a former Russian footballer. He primarily played as a winger, but could also play in the centre of midfield.

Club career
He made his Russian Premier League debut for FC Luch-Energiya Vladivostok on 18 March 2006 in a game against FC Spartak Moscow.

External links
 
 Player page on the official FC Saturn Moscow Oblast website 
 
 

1981 births
Sportspeople from Saratov
Living people
Russian footballers
FC Luch Vladivostok players
FC Fakel Voronezh players
FC Saturn Ramenskoye players
FC Khimki players
FC Sokol Saratov players
Russian Premier League players
FC Anzhi Makhachkala players
FC Mordovia Saransk players
Association football midfielders